Grether is a surname of Swiss German or South German origin. Notable people with the surname include:

Esther Grether (born c. 1936), Swiss art collector and businesswoman
Nicole Grether (born 1974), German badminton player
Simon Grether (born 1992), Swiss footballer

See also
Grether's Pastilles, a Swiss brand of confectionery

References

Surnames from given names
Surnames of Swiss origin
Surnames of German origin